Comamonas acidovorans is a Gram-negative, non-spore-forming, aerobic, rod-shaped bacterium from the genus Comamonas and family Comamonadaceae. C. acidovorans occur in soil, mud, and water in Japan, the Netherlands, Great Britain, the US, Spain, and Sweden. It has a major role in natural biodegradation.

References

Comamonadaceae
Bacteria described in 1987